"Places I've Never Been" is a song written by Tony Martin, Reese Wilson and Aimee Mayo, and recorded by American country music artist Mark Wills.  It was released in February 1997 as the third and final single from his album Mark Wills.  It reached number 5 on the United States Billboard Hot Country Singles & Tracks chart and number 7 on the RPM Country Tracks chart in Canada.

Music video
The music video was directed by Steven Goldmann and premiered in February 1997.

Chart performance
"Places I've Never Been" debuted at number 58 on the U.S. Billboard Hot Country Singles & Tracks for the week of March 1, 1997.

Year-end charts

References

1997 singles
Mark Wills songs
Songs written by Aimee Mayo
Songs written by Tony Martin (songwriter)
Song recordings produced by Keith Stegall
Music videos directed by Steven Goldmann
Song recordings produced by Carson Chamberlain
Mercury Records singles
1996 songs
Songs written by Reese Wilson